Hirstglen is a rural locality in the Toowoomba Region on the Darling Downs, Queensland, Australia.

Geography
Part of the southern boundary is marked by Kings Creek, a tributary of the Condamine River. The northern and eastern boundary roughly follows a ridge which marks the watershed of the Condamine.

Road infrastructure
The Gatton–Clifton Road runs through from north to south, and the Greenmount-Hirstvale Road enters from the west.

History 
Hirstglen State School opened on 6 May 1930 and closed on 22 February 1948.

Education 
There are no schools in Hirstglen. The nearest primary school is in neighbouring Pilton. The nearest secondary school is in Clifton.

References

Toowoomba Region
Localities in Queensland